József Michl (born 1960) is a Hungarian politician, who was elected the mayor of Tata in 2006. He was a member of the National Assembly (MP) for Tata (Komárom-Esztergom County Constituency II) from 2010 to 2014.

References

1960 births
Living people
Mayors of places in Hungary
Fidesz politicians
Christian Democratic People's Party (Hungary) politicians
Members of the National Assembly of Hungary (2010–2014)
Politicians from Budapest